Tim Wilkison defeated Peter Feigl 6–3, 4–6, 6–4, 2–6, 6–2 to win the 1979 Heineken Open singles competition. Eliot Teltscher was the champion but did not defend his title.

Seeds
A champion seed is indicated in bold text while text in italics indicates the round in which that seed was eliminated.

  Peter Feigl (final)
  Kim Warwick (quarterfinals)
  Bernard Mitton (second round)
  John Sadri (second round)
  Steve Docherty (second round)
  Russell Simpson (first round)
  Brian Fairlie (first round)
  Tim Wilkison (champion)

Draw

Key
 Q - Qualifier

NB: The Final was the best of 5 sets while all other rounds were the best of 3 sets.

Final

Section 1

Section 2

External links
 1979 Men's Singles draw

Singles
ATP Auckland Open